Lahore Garrison Golf & Country Club is a Golf and Country club in Lahore, Punjab, Pakistan. It is a 72 par United States Golf Association (USGA) golf course with 18 holes. The Club provides premier Golf facility to its members coupled with Swimming Pool, Long Tennis, Squish, archery and dining and amusement facilities. The Membership is open for all but limited for only Golf lovers and gentry class of the society who enjoy certain status. Recently Coffee Shop added to make it more fascinating. Club also provides beautiful Cart service to the senior golfers. Having membership of the Club is a status symbol.

See also 

 List of sports venues in Lahore

References 

Golf clubs and courses in Pakistan
Sports venues in Pakistan
Sports venues in Lahore